A DIEP flap is type of breast reconstruction where blood vessels, fat, and skin from the lower belly are relocated to the chest to rebuild breasts after mastectomy. DIEP stands for the deep inferior epigastric perforator artery, which runs through the abdomen. This is a type of autologous (using one's own tissue) reconstruction, meaning one's own tissue is used.

Overview 
The DIEP flap reconstruction procedure is similar to the muscle-sparing free TRAM flap procedure, but it only requires the removal of skin and fat. Unlike in the TRAM procedure, however, no muscle is sacrificed. The DIEP flap—like the TRAM flap—requires an incision into the abdominal (rectus) muscle, as the blood vessels, or perforators, required to keep the tissue alive lie just beneath or within this muscle. Therefore, a small incision is made in the abdominal muscle in order to access the vessels.

After the skin, tissues and perforators (collectively known as the "flap") have been dissected, the flap is transplanted and connected to the patient's chest using microsurgery. The plastic surgeon then shapes the flap to create the new breast.  As no abdominal muscle is removed or transferred to the breast, patients typically see a lower risk of losing abdominal muscle strength and may experience a faster recovery compared to TRAM flap patients. Studies comparing abdominal results with the muscle-sparing free TRAM and the DIEP show that abdominal wall hernias occur less frequently in DIEP patients, although the abdominal wall bulge rates are similar for both procedures.

Many women who undergo this form of reconstruction enjoy the added benefit of a flatter abdomen, with results that mimic a “tummy tuck” procedure. However, one risk of these procedures is the potential denervation of the abdominal musculature following the DIEP dissection. In addition, as with all types of breast reconstruction, two or three stages performed a few months apart are often required to complete the reconstruction process and to obtain the best cosmetic result.

DIEP flap breast reconstruction is typically performed by the Plastic Surgery team (rather than the Breast Surgery team) so is only available in centres with Plastic Surgery support. It is a more complicated operation than other autologous or alloplastic options, but provides significantly better cosmetic results, which means better psychological outcomes and with a lower risk of reconstruction failure. Recent advances in preoperative imaging of the blood vessels in the abdomen (using CT or MRI scans), operative time and complication rates can be reduced in DIEP flap breast reconstruction.

In non medical terms
DIEP flap surgery is a breast reconstruction after a mastectomy of a single or both breasts by using natural fat from the patient's own body.

Natural breast tissue
Natural fat tissue is harvested from the belly and used to replace the malignant breast tissue.  The breast will also gain weight and lose weight in line with the rest of the body so that both breasts will retain symmetry of size.  Usually there is no long term follow up surgery required in the future as may be the case with silicone implants, however patients may require a longer hospital stay at the time of the operation to monitor the flap in the immediate post-operative phase where those receiving implants can sometimes be done as a day case.

Timing of the reconstruction 
The operation can be performed at the time of the mastectomy (immediate breast reconstruction) or at a later time point (delayed breast reconstruction). Reasons to delay the operation include: surgeon preference, patient preference, advanced tumor requiring radiation therapy and/or chemotherapy, or because of a complication with an immediate breast reconstruction. The DIEP flap, because it can restore both the surface area and volume of a breast, is ideal for both immediate and delayed breast reconstruction.

Recovery 
Recovery from a DIEP flap happens in stages. Most patients leave the hospital in approximately 4 days, feel well after 2-3 weeks, and are able to return to normal activities in 3 - 4 months.

Abdominoplasty 
During the harvesting of belly tissue fat and belly skin provides an aesthetic benefit to the abdomen. It is often likened to an abdominoplasty or "tummy tuck", however the two procedures have notable differences.

Similarities to an abdominoplasty

 Tissue removed: Excess abdominal adipose tissue and skin are removed in both procedures while also preserving the abdominal muscles. Upper abdominal skin is stretched taut to close the incision. The belly button is reattached through a new opening.
 Incision pattern: Both procedures remove a football-shaped area of skin and fat resulting in a hip-to-hip scar. The scar is often low enough to be hidden by underwear, however some DIEP patients end up with a higher than ideal scar due to their anatomical tissue distribution needed for the breast reconstruction. 
 Aesthetic results: All patients generally benefit from a flatter abdomen and improved waist contour.

Differences from an abdominoplasty 

 Abdominal wall tightening: A hallmark of the tummy tuck is that surgeons use internal sutures to tighten the abdominal muscles. This creates a smooth and firm result. This is not always a part of DIEP flap breast reconstruction and varies by surgeon. Those surgeons who opt to suture abdominal muscles during the DIEP procedure do not tighten the muscles as extensively as they would with a tummy tuck. 
 Surgeon training: DIEP flap surgery requires the expertise of highly trained microsurgeons who are skilled in harvesting blood vessels and sensory nerves. No special care for blood vessels or sensory nerves is necessary for a tummy tuck and standard trained plastic surgeons are capable of that procedure.
 Purpose of procedure: A tummy tuck is a cosmetic procedure used to give the abdomen a slimmer appearance. DIEP flap reconstruction is to reconstruct breasts after a single or double mastectomy due to breast cancer. 
Length of surgery/hospital stay: A DIEP flap reconstruction surgery takes about six to eight hours on average. If the mastectomy is performed during the same procedure, the length of time will be hours longer. Patients recovering from DIEP flap reconstruction remain in the hospital for an average of five days. A tummy tuck typically takes about three hours. It is often an out-patient procedure with no need for the patient to stay overnight in the hospital. 

With a standard "tummy tuck" where excess abdominal skin and fat are removed, the DIEP flap procedure involves a longer recovery time as significant surgery is performed to the 2 vertical abdominal Rectus muscles in the process of careful "scratching" and finding the tiny blood vessel or "perforators" required to provide blood supply to the fat tissues.  These are the "sit up" muscles or also known as the 6-pack muscles. They are essential muscle of the abdominal core and take some time to heal. In cases where complications occur (5%) these muscles are severely weakened and will impact mobility or resulting in a tummy bulge.  In these cases a reinforcement mesh may solve the weakening but in rare cases the muscles are permanently weakened.  The belly button is reattached in this process.

Breast lift 
Another benefit of this operation is that both breast are given a breast lift.  This will leave permanent scarring.  The extent and placement of the incisions and scars varies according  to preference and skill of the surgeon.  The lift is achieved by reattaching the nipple higher up on the breast  and removing excess skin.  The usually ample amount of tummy fat allows to the surgeon to give the patient an increase in breast size for women with smaller breasts.

Once off operation 
This operation can be performed once only.  In the case of a single mastectomy the second breast cannot be rebuilt at a later time with a flap of fat tissue from the belly. For this reason some patient may choose to perform a mastectomy on the non-cancerous breast to reduce the chance of later development of cancer.

Areolae and nipples 
Unless a nipple sparing mastectomy was performed, the areola and nipple of the cancerous breast is discarded in this operation and the new areola is formed using a disk of tummy skin.  If the patient chooses the new nipple and areola are formed as a follow up procedure through surgery and a tattoo process.  Some women are satisfied without a nipple and choose to forgo the tattoo.

Loss of sensation 
Sensation in the nipples, much of the breast and an area surrounding the tummy tuck scar is significantly less after this operation, as microsurgery is routinely focused on vascular supply leaving the nerves untreated. Although it is more technically challenging, cutaneous sensation can potentially be restored by identifying and connecting intercostal nerve branches.

References

External links 
 DIEP flap entry in the public domain NCI Dictionary of Cancer Terms

Breast surgery